Yami Gautam Dhar (born 28 November 1988) is an Indian actress known predominantly for her work in Hindi films. She sprang into prominence after doing some commercials for Glow & Lovely and began her acting career in television shows, followed by South Indian films and Bollywood.

Gautam's initial success had been playing lead roles in TV shows like Chand Ke Paar Chalo (2008–2009) and Yeh Pyar Na Hoga Kam (2009–2010), post which she became a part of numerous Malayalam, Tamil and Telugu films. It was her highly acclaimed Hindi film debut role in the critically and commercially successful satirical rom-com Vicky Donor (2012), that gave her wider appraisal and fame.

Though followed by few unprofitable features, with the exception of the thriller Badlapur (2015), Gautam reinforced and gained high critical and commercial success with her highest-grossing releases including the revenge drama Kaabil (2017), the action war film Uri: The Surgical Strike (2019) and the satirical comedy Bala (2019).

Early life and background 
Yami Gautam was born in a Hindu Brahmin family in Bilaspur, Himachal Pradesh and was brought up in Chandigarh. Her father Mukesh Gautam is a Punjabi film director. He is the VP of PTC Network. Her mother is Anjali Gautam. She has a younger sister Surilie Gautam, who made her big screen debut with the Punjabi film Power Cut. She did her regular schooling, and later entered college to pursue a graduate degree in law honours. She had aspired to join Indian Administrative Services (IAS) as a young girl, but at the age of 20, she decided to venture into an acting career. Though she was pursuing studies in Law Honors (first-year PU Student of law), she left full-time studies for acting. Recently, she has been doing her part-time graduation from Mumbai. She is fond of reading, interior decoration and listening to music.

Personal life 
Yami Gautam married Aditya Dhar on 4 June 2021. After marriage, she changed her name to Yami Gautam Dhar.

Career

Television career (2008–2010) 
Gautam was 20 when she moved to Mumbai to pursue a career in movies. She made her television debut in Chand Ke Paar Chalo. She continued to play the lead in Raajkumar Aaryyan. Following this, she played her most notable role in television in, Yeh Pyar Na Hoga Kam, which aired on Colors. She has also participated in reality shows Meethi Choori No 1 and Kitchen Champion Season 1.

Film debut and early work (2009–2018) 

After making her acting debut as the lead in the 2009 Kannada-language film Ullasa Utsaha, Gautam made her Bollywood debut in a leading role in Shoojit Sircar's romantic comedy Vicky Donor (2012). Co-starring opposite debutante Ayushmann Khurrana, Annu Kapoor, and Dolly Ahluwalia, she portrayed Ashima Roy, a Bengali woman who falls in love with the titular character, a Punjabi lad from the Arora family, and gets to know about his past after their marriage. The film, which marked Bollywood actor John Abraham's production debut, received positive reviews from critics and proved to be a major commercial success as one of the highest-grossing films of the year with worldwide grossing of 645 million (US$3.9 million). For her debut performance, Gautam received critical acclaim as well as several awards and nominations, including the award for Best Female Debut (tied with Ileana D'Cruz for Barfi!) at the Zee Cine Awards, and a nomination under the same category at the 58th Filmfare Awards.

After a two-year absence from Bollywood films, Gautam returned in 2014 and appeared in two films, the first of which was Eeshwar Nivas' romantic comedy film Total Siyappa, co-starring Ali Zafar, Anupam Kher, and Kirron Kher, in which she played the love interest of Zafar's character. Gautam's second Bollywood release that year was Prabhu Deva's action thriller Action Jackson, in which Ajay Devgn portrayed a double role while Gautam and Sonakshi Sinha were featured as the love interests of his characters. Both Total Siyappa and Action Jackson underperformed at the box office.

In 2015, Gautam appeared alongside Varun Dhawan and Nawazuddin Siddiqui in Sriram Raghavan's action thriller Badlapur. The film, which focuses on the story of a man named Raghu who, over the course of 15 years, avenges the murders of his wife Misha and his son, emerged as a critical and commercial success, collecting 770 million (US$11 million) worldwide, with Gautam's performance receiving praise.

In 2016, Gautam played Pulkit Samrat's love interest in two romances—Divya Khosla Kumar's Sanam Re and Vivek Agnihotri's Junooniyat. In the former, she played a high-school girl who falls in love with Samrat's character, and in the latter, she portrayed a Punjabi girl who falls in love with an army officer. Both Sanam Re and Junooniyat were critical and commercial failures.

The following year, Gautam collaborated with Hrithik Roshan on Sanjay Gupta's revengeful romantic thriller Kaabil (2017), which tells the story of a blind man who avenges the rape of his blind wife. The film, as well as her performance, received mixed-to-positive reviews, and the film emerged as a financial success, earning 1.96 billion (US$28 million) worldwide. Later in 2017, Gautam featured briefly in Ram Gopal Varma's political thriller Sarkar 3, the third installment of Varma's Sarkar franchise, alongside Amitabh Bachchan, Jackie Shroff, Manoj Bajpayee, and Amit Sadh. Sarkar 3 failed to do well at the box office. Gautam's next release was the Shree Narayan Singh directed social problem drama Batti Gul Meter Chalu (2018), in which she played a lawyer alongside Shahid Kapoor, Shraddha Kapoor, and Divyendu Sharma.

Breakthrough and success (2019-present) 

Gautam's breakthrough role was in 2019 when she appeared in Aditya Dhar's military action thriller Uri: The Surgical Strike, alongside Vicky Kaushal, Paresh Rawal, Mohit Raina, and Kirti Kulhari. Based on the 2016 Uri attack, Gautam portrayed Pallavi Sharma, a nurse turned intelligence officer. Upon release, the film received high critical acclaim, with Gautam's performance receiving high praise. The film emerged as the third-highest grossing Hindi film of the year, earning over 3.42 billion (US$44 million) worldwide. She next reunited with Khurrana in Amar Kaushik's comedy-drama Bala, a satire on physical attractiveness, which was released on 7 November 2019. Also featuring Bhumi Pednekar, the film opened to positive reviews, with Gautam unanimously receiving acclaim for her portrayal of Pari Mishra, a ditsy Tik Toker and a part-time model hailing from Lucknow, who, upon finding out about her husband's baldness, feels cheated and leaves him. Film critic Sukanya Verma found Gautam "part delirious, part deluded" in the film and felt "there's a gentle unhinged air to her compulsive, sincere artificiality that makes her both fascinating and heartbreaking" and featured her in Rediff's list of the Best Bollywood Actresses in 2019. Bala proved to be a commercial success with a worldwide gross of 1.7billion (US$22 million).

In 2020, she appeared as Ginny in the film Ginny Weds Sunny opposite Vikrant Massey, directed by debutant Puneet Khanna and produced by Vinod Bachchan. The film was directly released on Netflix on 9 October 2020, instead of a theatrical release due to the COVID-19 pandemic. Upon its release, the film received mixed reviews. In 2021, Gautam played the role of Maya in Pavan Kirpalani's horror comedy Bhoot Police, co-starring Saif Ali Khan, Arjun Kapoor, and Jacqueline Fernandez. The film was met with mixed reviews. She had a special appearance as Mannat in Shava Ni Girdhari Lal.

Gautam's first film in 2022 was Behzad Khambata's thriller A Thursday, in which she co-starred with Neha Dhupia and Atul Kulkarni. Gautam was cast in the lead role of Naina Jaiswal, a playschool teacher who takes 16 children hostage. On 17 February 2022, the film premiered on Disney+ Hotstar. Upon its release, the film opened to mixed-to-positive reviews, with Gautam particularly receiving positive reviews for her performance. Sneha Benganl of CNBC TV18 found it her "career's best performance" and felt Gautam as Naina was "equal parts dangerous and vulnerable, daring and conflicted."

Gautam's second film in 2022 was Tushar Jalota's social comedy Dasvi, alongside Abhishek Bachchan and Nimrat Kaur. Gautam was cast in the role of Jyoti Deswal, an IPS officer in the jail where Chief Minister Ganga Ram Chaudhary was imprisoned. The film premiered on Netflix and JioCinema on 7 April 2022. Upon its release, the film opened to mixed reviews.

Upcoming projects

She will play the protagonist in Aniruddha Roy Chowdhary’s social drama Lost and will also appear in OMG 2.

Media image 

Femina noted, "Yami Gautam has her feet planted firmly on the ground, she neither lets success go to her head nor allows setbacks to drag her down." Firstpost noted, "Yami Gautam has always ruled the hearts of the masses with her distinctive charm."

Gautam has frequently featured on Times' 50 Most Desirable Women list. She ranked 12th in 2012, 16th in 2018, 8th in 2019 and 15th in 2020. In addition to her acting career, Gautam is a prominent celebrity endorser for brands and products including Glow & Lovely, Cornetto, Chevrolet and Dollar Missy.

Filmography

Films

Television

Awards and nominations

See also 
 List of Hindi film actresses

References

External links 

 
 
 

Living people
1988 births
Actresses from Himachal Pradesh
Indian film actresses
Indian television actresses
Actresses in Tamil cinema
Actresses in Hindi cinema
Actresses in Telugu cinema
Actresses in Kannada cinema
People from Bilaspur, Himachal Pradesh
Actresses from Chandigarh
Punjabi people
21st-century Indian actresses
Actresses in Malayalam cinema
Screen Awards winners
Zee Cine Awards winners
International Indian Film Academy Awards winners
Actresses in Punjabi cinema